Nordlicht may refer to:

 Mark Nordlicht (born 1968), an accused criminal and a failed hedge fund manager
 Nordlicht, a 2019 album by Versengold
 Operation Nordlicht (1942)
 Operation Nordlicht (1944–45)
 , a 1936 cargo ship formerly SS Kolno
 Nordlicht, a steam locomotive in the LDE – Peter Rothwell to Nordlicht series

See also
 
 Operation Northern Lights (disambiguation)